Les Arcs (also known as Les Arcs-sur-Argens, literally Les Arcs on Argens) is a commune in the Var department in the Provence-Alpes-Côte d'Azur region in Southeastern France. In 2019, it had a population of 7,066.

Geography
Les Arcs is served by Les Arcs–Draguignan station (Gare des Arcs–Draguignan) on the Marseille–Ventimiglia railway. The station, located within the commune of Les Arcs, also serves the greater neighbouring city of Draguignan, as the name suggests.

Climate

Les Arcs has a hot-summer Mediterranean climate (Köppen climate classification Csa).

Population

See also
Communes of the Var department

References

External links

  

Arcs